The Meyerson convention is a defensive bidding convention to an opponent opening bid of one notrump.  Double shows at least four cards in a major and at least four cards in a minor, with both suit lengths totalling at least nine cards.  A 2 bid shows at least four cards in each major.  The other suited 2-level bids are natural; they simply show cards in the bid suit.

After a player doubles using the Meyerson convention, his partner may bid 2 to ask the doubler to bid his longer suit or pass if that suit is clubs.  Doubler's partner may also bid 2 to ask the doubler to bid his major suit.  Any other bid that doubler's partner makes is natural.

The Meyerson convention may be used in either direct or balancing position, and it may also be used against strong or weak one notrump openings.

The Meyerson convention is named after its inventor, Adam Meyerson of Los Angeles, California.  The convention is quite similar to another convention known alternatively as Woolsey, after Kit Woolsey, or Robinson, after Steve Robinson of Arlington, Virginia.  The Meyerson convention was originally developed as an ACBL General Convention Chart alternative to Woolsey/Robinson, which is not allowed in many ACBL sanctioned events.

See also
List of defenses to 1NT

Bridge conventions